Bischoffena is a genus of small air-breathing land snails, terrestrial gastropod mollusks in the family Charopidae.

Species
Species within the genus Bischoffena include:
 Bischoffena bischoffensis

References 

 
Charopidae
Taxonomy articles created by Polbot